Jozef Repčík (born 3 August 1986 in Brezová pod Bradlom) is a former Slovak athlete specializing in the 800 metres. He competed at the 2008 Beijing Olympic Games without reaching the semifinals.

He won his first major international medal at the 2013 Summer Universiade where he finished second.

Competition record

Personal bests
Outdoor
800 metres – 1:44.94 (Ostrava 2008)
1000 metres – 2:19.38 (Strasbourg 2008)
1500 metres – 3:41.99 (Prague 2017)

Indoor
400 metres – 48.76 (Bratislava 2006)
800 metres – 1:47.06 (Birmingham 2008)
1000 metres – 2:19.15 (Stockholm 2008)
1500 metres – 3:42.79 (Ostrava 2017)

References

External links 
 
 Jozef Repčík at the Slovenský Olympijský Výbor 
 
 NBC 2008 Olympics profile

Slovak male middle-distance runners
Living people
Olympic athletes of Slovakia
Athletes (track and field) at the 2008 Summer Olympics
Athletes (track and field) at the 2016 Summer Olympics
1986 births
People from Brezová pod Bradlom
Sportspeople from the Trenčín Region
World Athletics Championships athletes for Slovakia
European Games silver medalists for Slovakia
Athletes (track and field) at the 2015 European Games
European Games medalists in athletics
Universiade medalists in athletics (track and field)
Universiade silver medalists for Slovakia
Competitors at the 2007 Summer Universiade
Competitors at the 2009 Summer Universiade
Medalists at the 2013 Summer Universiade